William Bethome, STP  was an Oxford college head in the 15th-century.

Bethome was educated at Eton College. He was Rector of Lincoln College, Oxford, from 1488 to 1493.

References

Rectors of Lincoln College, Oxford
People educated at Eton College
15th-century English people